Plateau d'Hauteville is a commune in the Ain department in eastern France. The municipality was established on 1 January 2019 by merger of the former communes of Cormaranche-en-Bugey, Hauteville-Lompnes (the seat), Hostiaz and Thézillieu.

Geography
The river Albarine flows through the commune.

Climate
Plateau d'Hauteville has a oceanic climate (Köppen climate classification Cfb).

Population

See also
Communes of the Ain department

References

Communes of Ain
Communes nouvelles of Ain
Populated places established in 2019

2019 establishments in France